Margaret Winifred Ross, OAM is an Australian Paralympic archer. At the 1962 Commonwealth Paraplegic Games in Perth, she won a silver medal in the Women's Swimming 50 m Crawl Class E event and bronze medals in the Women's Shot Put Class D and Women's  Swimming 50 m Breaststroke Class E events.

She competed at the 1972 Heidelberg Paralympics in the Women's FITA Round Open finishing 5th. At the 1976 Toronto Paralympics, she competed in archery and dartchery events. She teamed with John Kestel to win the gold medal in the dartchery Mixed Teams Open event. In 1982, she received a Medal of the Order of Australia for "service to the disabled particularly in the field of sport".

References

External links
 

Paralympic archers of Australia
Paralympic dartchers of Australia
Archers at the 1972 Summer Paralympics
Archers at the 1976 Summer Paralympics
Dartchers at the 1976 Summer Paralympics
Paralympic gold medalists for Australia
Wheelchair category Paralympic competitors
Recipients of the Medal of the Order of Australia
Year of birth missing (living people)
Living people
Medalists at the 1976 Summer Paralympics
Australian female archers
Paralympic medalists in dartchery